Transwestern Pipeline Company, LLC owns and operates a natural gas transmission system that connects natural gas supplies in the San Juan and Rocky Mountain Basins in northwest New Mexico, southwest Colorado, the Texas-Oklahoma Panhandle, and the Permian Basin region of West Texas and Southeastern New Mexico with California, Arizona, Nevada in the West and Texas, and New Mexico on its Eastern end. Transwestern is a "natural gas company" as defined under the Natural Gas Act, and is regulated under the rules and regulations of the Federal Energy Regulatory Commission.  

Warren Petroleum, along with Monterey Oil Company and J. R. Butler founded the Transwestern Pipeline Company on March 11, 1957.

Energy Transfer Partners bought the Transwestern Pipeline in 2006.

References

External links
 Pipeline Electronic Bulletin Board

Natural gas pipelines in the United States
Natural gas pipelines in New Mexico
Natural gas pipelines in Colorado
Natural gas pipelines in Oklahoma
Natural gas pipelines in Texas
Natural gas pipelines in California
Natural gas pipelines in Nevada
Natural gas pipelines in Arizona